During the 2007–08 season Cowdenbeath competed in the Scottish Second Division, Scottish Cup, Scottish League Cup and the Challenge Cup.

Summary
Cowdenbeath finished ninth in the Second Division, entering the play-offs losing 2–1 to Arbroath in the semifinal. They reached the fourth round of the Scottish Cup, the second round of the League Cup and were eliminated in the first round of the Challenge Cup.

Results & fixtures

Scottish Second Division

Second Division play-offs

Challenge Cup

League Cup

Scottish Cup

League table

Player statistics

Squad 

|}
a.  Includes other competitive competitions, including playoffs and the Scottish Challenge Cup.

References

Cowdenbeath
Cowdenbeath F.C. seasons